Steer Point railway station served the village of Brixton, Devon, England, from 1898 to 1960 on the Plymouth to Yealmpton Branch.

History 
The station opened on 17 January 1898 by the Great Western Railway. It was closed on 7 July 1930 but reopened on 3 November 1941 so the nearby residents could escape the blitz. Like the other stations on the branch, services were diverted to  after the original  station was damaged by bombing during the Second World War. The station closed to passengers again on 6 October 1947 and to goods traffic on 29 February 1960.

References

External links 

Disused railway stations in Devon
Former Great Western Railway stations
Railway stations in Great Britain opened in 1898
Railway stations in Great Britain closed in 1930
Railway stations in Great Britain opened in 1941
Railway stations in Great Britain closed in 1947
1897 establishments in England
1960 disestablishments in England